The Logia Masónica Hijos de la Luz, on Avenida José C. Barbosa in Yauco, Puerto Rico, is a stuccoed masonry building constructed in 1894. It was listed on the National Register of Historic Places in 1988.

It is Classical Revival in style, designed by French architect André Troublard and built by master builder Jesus Emmanuelli.

Also known as Logia Masónica, it served as a meeting hall.

It is probably the earliest built and oldest surviving purpose-built Masonic building in Puerto Rico.

André Troublard also designed the Casa Franceschi Antongiorgi, also in Yauco and listed on the National Register.

See also
Logia Adelphia, in Mayagüez, Puerto Rico, also NRHP-listed

References

External links

Masonic buildings in Puerto Rico
National Register of Historic Places in Yauco, Puerto Rico
Masonic buildings completed in 1894
1894 establishments in Puerto Rico
Neoclassical architecture in Puerto Rico
Clubhouses on the National Register of Historic Places in Puerto Rico